Redway is a surname.

List of the people with the surname 

 Alan Redway (born 1935), Canadian lawyer and former politician
 Mike Redway (born 1939), English singer, songwriter and record producer
 Millicent Redway, Jamaican-Canadian businessperson and publisher

Surnames
Surnames of British Isles origin